Andy Barr is the name of:

 Andy Barr (American politician) (born 1973), U.S. Representative from Kentucky
 Andy Barr (Irish politician) (1913–2003), Northern Irish communist and trade unionist
 Andrew Barr (born 1973), Australian politician
 Andrew Barr (musician), Canadian drummer of The Slip and The Barr Brothers